Tracy Lawrence is the seventh studio album by the American country music artist of the same name, released in 2001, his only album for the Warner Bros. Records label. Only two singles were released from this album: "Life Don't Have to Be So Hard" and "What a Memory", the latter of which failed to make Top 40 on the country charts. "That Was Us" was later recorded by Randy Travis on his 2004 album Passing Through.

Track listing

Personnel
From Liner Notes
Alison Brown - banjo on "She Loved the Devil Out of Me" and "God's Green Earth"
Eric Darken - percussion
Sonny Garrish - steel guitar, Dobro on "Life Don't Have to Be So Hard" and "That Was Us", pedabro on "Crawlin' Again"
Owen Hale - drums
Aubrey Haynie - fiddle, mandolin on "Whole Lot of Lettin' Go"
Wes Hightower - background vocals
Tracy Lawrence - lead vocals
B. James Lowry - acoustic guitar
Liana Manis - background vocals
Gary Lunn - bass guitar
Brent Rowan - electric guitar, banjo on "I Won All the Battles"
Gary Smith - keyboards

Chart performance

References

2001 albums
Tracy Lawrence albums
Warner Records albums